Lolland Falster Airport, also known as Maribo Airport , is an airport between the towns of Holeby and Rødby south of Maribo on the island of Lolland in Denmark.

Airlines and Destinations
There are currently no scheduled services to/from Lolland Falster Airport.

References

Airports in Denmark
Buildings and structures in Region Zealand
Transport in Region Zealand
Lolland